Sybra fauveli is a species of beetle in the family Cerambycidae. It was described by Théry in 1897.

References

fauveli
Beetles described in 1897